Kaattile Paattu is a 1982 Indian Malayalam film, directed and produced by K. P. Kumaran. The film stars Nedumudi Venu, Balan K. Nair, Poornima Jayaram and Sukumari in the lead roles. The film has musical score by K. Raghavan.

Plot
It is a love story of a mentally disabled woman (Poornima Jayaram) finding her place in the heart of a primeval tribal man (Nedumudi Venu).

Cast

Nedumudi Venu as Chinnan
Balan K. Nair as Prabhakara Panikkar
Poornima Jayaram as Priya
Sukumari as Janaki
Jagathy Sreekumar as Bombay Dharam
Kaviyoor Ponnamma as Raji
Adoor Bhasi as Raghavan Pilla
Venu Nagavally as Devan
Sreenivasan as Balu
Maniyanpilla Raju as Raju
Anju as Young Priya
Antony Vazhoor
Aryad Gopalakrishnan
Chacko
Kanakalatha as Latha
Madhu Iravankara
Raghunath
Sankar Mohan as Suresh

Soundtrack

References

External links
 

1982 films
1980s Malayalam-language films